Salomon Plessner (– ) was a German Jewish translator and maggid.

Biography
Salomon Plessner was born in Breslau to Rabbi Yehuda Plesner, who died when Salomon was young. Having to support his mother and himself, Plessner engaged in business, but found time to study Hebrew, rabbinics, and German, under Wessely's influence. He published in 1819 a Hebrew translation of the Apocryphal additions to the Book of Esther, under the title Hosafah li-Megillat Ester, with a literary-historical introduction. 

At the same time he became known as an eloquent maggid. Through his sermons and his close association with Rabbi Akiva Eger, Plessner became known as a defender of Orthodox Judaism against the growing Reform movement. Forbidden by the police from delivering sermons, he in 1823 settled in Festenberg, Silesia. He presented a defense of the Talmud to the Posen government in 1826, prompting the government to revoke a decree forbidding Talmudic instruction in schools.

Pressner moved to Berlin in 1830, where he earned a livelihood by lecturing in the Berlin beit midrash. In 1832 his Nozelim min Lebanon was published, consisting of a Hebrew translation of a part of the Apocrypha, with an appendix, entitled Duda'im, containing exegetical notes, verses in Hebrew and German, and sermons. The following year he was invited to dedicate the new synagogue at Bromberg, for which occasion he composed poems in Hebrew and in German, which were published under the title Shirim la-Ḥanukkat Bet ha-Tefillah (1834). He left Berlin and settled in Posen in 1843, where he remained active as a maggid, chiefly at the Neuschul.

References

External links

  at the Online Books Page
 Digitized works by Salomon Plessner at the Leo Baeck Institute, New York

1797 births
1883 deaths
19th-century Jewish biblical scholars
19th-century German rabbis
Jewish translators
German Orthodox rabbis
Hebrew–German translators
Translators to Hebrew
19th-century German translators
People from Twardogóra